Paederota is a genus of flowering plants in the family Plantaginaceae. It has only one species, Paederota bonarota, which grows only on dolomite in the Alps of Italy, Austria and Slovenia.

Species
Presently only one species is considered valid, the type species Paederota bonarota. A large number of species names have been previously associated with Paederota. Of these only Paederota lutea has any recent currency. 

Paederota ageria L.
Paederota amherstiana Wall.
Paederota angustifolia Turcz. ex Besser
Paederota axillaris Siebold & Zucc.
Paederota bonae-spei L.
Paederota bonarota (L.) L.
Paederota bonarota Jacq.
Paederota borealis Lam. ex Choisy
Paederota bracteata Siebold & Zucc.
Paederota caerulea Scop.
Paederota capitis-bonae-spei Christm.
Paederota chamaedrifolia Steud.
Paederota chamaedrifolia Suffren
Paederota × churchillii (Prohaska) Huter
Paederota churchillii Huter
Paederota cochlearifolia J.Koenig ex Rottb.
Paederota densifolia F.Muell.
Paederota humilis Stephan ex Link
Paederota humilis Willd. ex Link
Paederota lutea Scop.
Paederota minima J.Koenig ex Retz.
Paederota minima Retz.
Paederota nudicaulis Lam.
Paederota obliqua A.Dietr.
Paederota pontica Rupr. ex Boiss.
Paederota racemosa Houtt.
Paederota sibirica Walp.
Paederota tubiflora (Fisch. & C.A.Mey.) Walp.
Paederota tubiflora Walp.
Paederota urticifolia Brign.
Paederota variegata Raeusch.
Paederota villosula Miq.
Paederota virginica (L.) Torr.
Paederota wulfenia Willd.
Paederota zannichellii Brign.

References

Plantaginaceae
Plantaginaceae genera
Monotypic Lamiales genera
Plants described in 1762